Guillermo Segundo Rodríguez Pérez (born May 15, 1978) is a Venezuelan former professional baseball catcher and current coach in the San Francisco Giants organization. He played in Major League Baseball (MLB) for the San Francisco Giants and the Baltimore Orioles.

Career
Rodríguez was a 12-year minor league veteran who made his major league debut with the San Francisco Giants on June 13, . He was called up as a replacement for injured catcher and fellow countryman Eliézer Alfonzo. On August 26, 2007, Rodriguez hit his first major league home run off Milwaukee Brewers pitcher Dave Bush. On September 1, the Giants released him, and he signed with the Baltimore Orioles in December.

In 762 minor league games, Rodríguez posted a .253 batting average with 65 home runs and 349 RBI.

See also
 List of Major League Baseball players from Venezuela

References

External links

MLB.com Article

1978 births
Living people
Águilas del Zulia players
Bakersfield Blaze players
Baltimore Orioles players
Bellingham Giants players
Bowie Baysox players
Cardenales de Lara players
Fresno Grizzlies players
Major League Baseball catchers
Major League Baseball players from Venezuela
Mexican League baseball catchers
Mexican League baseball first basemen
Norfolk Tides players
Norwich Navigators players
Sportspeople from Barquisimeto
Pericos de Puebla players
Salem-Keizer Volcanoes players
San Francisco Giants players
San Jose Giants players
Shreveport Swamp Dragons players
Tiburones de La Guaira players
Tigres de Aragua players
Toledo Mud Hens players
Venezuelan expatriate baseball players in Mexico
Venezuelan expatriate baseball players in the United States
Venezuelan expatriate baseball players in Italy